Vallbona d'Anoia is a municipality in the comarca of Anoia in Catalonia, 
Spain. It is situated to the left of the Anoia river, on the road between Piera and Capellades. The town is 
served by a station on the FGC railway line R6 from Barcelona and 
Martorell to Igualada.

References

 Panareda Clopés, Josep Maria; Rios Calvet, Jaume; Rabella Vives, Josep Maria (1989). Guia de Catalunya, Barcelona: Caixa de Catalunya.  (Spanish).  (Catalan).

External links 
  
 Government data pages 

Municipalities in Anoia